Pennsylvania Route 756 (PA 756) is an east–west state route located in Cambria County, Pennsylvania.  Its western terminus is PA 403 in the Moxham section of Johnstown, and its eastern terminus is PA 160 in Elton, Adams Township.

Route description

PA 756 begins as Ohio Street at an intersection with PA 403 in the Moxham neighborhood of the city of Johnstown.  In the borough of Geistown, Bentwood Avenue meets PA 756.  PA 756 then makes a left turn onto Belmont Street.  At the intersection with Bedford Street and Scalp Avenue, commonly known as the Geistown Cloverleaf, PA 756 makes a right turn.  In Richland Township, PA 756 interchanges with US 219/PA 56.  The eastern terminus is located in Elton, Adams Township at PA 160.

Major intersections

Attractions
 Richland Towne Centre (former location of Richland Mall) located near the US 219/PA 56 interchange

See also

References

External links

Pennsylvania Highways: PA 756

756
Transportation in Cambria County, Pennsylvania